Isaiah LeFlore (born December 11, 2002) is an American professional soccer player who plays for Houston Dynamo 2 in the MLS Next Pro.

Career
LeFlore played for a season with Minnesota-based Shattuck-Saint Mary's before spending 3 years in Portugal with Associação Desportiva Oeiras. He returned to the United States and joined Sporting Kansas City's academy at the start of 2020.

On July 25, 2020, LeFlore appeared as an 85th-minute substitute during a 1-0 loss to Louisville City FC.

References

External links 
 Sporting KC profile
 

2002 births
Living people
American soccer players
Sporting Kansas City II players
S.C. Braga B players
Association football midfielders
People from Minneapolis
Soccer players from Minnesota
USL Championship players
Liga Portugal 2 players
MLS Next Pro players